The Ginetta G60 is a mid-engined sports car produced by British car manufacturer Ginetta Cars, based on the Ginetta F400, which itself was based on the Farbio GTS.

Specifications and Performance
The car was developed with driver focus in mind and therefore lacks an Anti-lock braking system, power steering and other modern technologies. The interior is fairly basic and features Alcantara trim with a touch screen in the carbon fibre centre console to control all the features i.e. the satellite navigation system, climate control, audio system and air conditioning. A carbon fibre steering wheel with silver gauges along with bucket seats complete the interior.

Production
Production of the G60 began in 2012. The car was manufactured at the Ginetta factory in Garforth, Yorkshire, and only around 50 a year were produced from 2012 through 2015. The base price of a G60 in 2012 was £68,000 (US$105,000).

In November 2015, Ginetta ended production of the G60 citing poor sales and manufacturing that became increasingly cost prohibitive.

References

External links

G60
Rear mid-engine, rear-wheel-drive vehicles
2010s cars
Sports cars
Cars introduced in 2012